Liudmila Nikoyan (born 1 August 1979) is a Russian born former Armenian tennis player.

In her career, Nikoyan won five doubles titles on the ITF circuit. On 9 October 2000, she reached her best singles ranking of world No. 500. On 15 May 2000, she peaked at No. 347 in the doubles rankings.

Playing for Armenia Fed Cup team, Nikoyan has a win–loss record of 21–7.

In 2010, Nikoyan retired from the professional tour. She became a beach tennis player.

ITF finals

Doubles (5–11)

References

External links
 
 
 

1979 births
Living people
Armenian female tennis players
Russian female tennis players
Russian people of Armenian descent
Female tennis players playing beach tennis